Winterbach is a municipality in the district of Bad Kreuznach in Rhineland-Palatinate, in western Germany. It belongs to the Rüdesheim association. Winterbach is also a state-approved resort.

Geography 
Winterbach is located in the southern Hunsrück, on the edge of the Soonwald at the 657 meter high Ellerspring. With 77.1 percent of the land area being wooded. The Ellerbach also flows through the village. Winterbach also includes the residences of Forsthaus Winterbach, Kreershäuschen and Kuhpferch.

References

Bad Kreuznach (district)